Conchopus is a genus of flies in the family Dolichopodidae. It is distributed in Japan, China, Taiwan, the Hawaiian Islands, and Wake Island. The species Conchopus borealis is also an introduced species in North America and South America. The genus is sometimes considered a synonym of Thambemyia, but is considered a valid genus by some authors.

Taxonomy and species
Takagi (1965) originally divided the genus into seven species groups. According to Masunaga et al. (2005) and Masunaga & Saigusa (2010), the genus can be divided into two clades: one containing the rectus species group (including the type species), and the other containing all other species groups, for which the authors intended to propose a new genus. The latter clade they also consider to be the sister group of Thambemyia.

rectus species group (= Conchopus sensu stricto):
 Conchopus acrosticalis (Parent, 1937) – Hawai‘i, Maui, Lāna‘i, Moloka‘i
 Conchopus borealis Takagi, 1965 – Japan, North America (introduced), Peru (introduced)
 Conchopus ciliatus Masunaga & Saigusa, 2010 – Hawai‘i, Maui, O‘ahu, Lisianski
 Conchopus crassinervis Masunaga & Saigusa, 2010 – Kaua‘i
 Conchopus menehune Masunaga & Saigusa, 2010 – Kaua‘i, Nihoa
 Conchopus minutus Masunaga & Saigusa, 2010 – Hawai‘i, Maui, Lāna‘i, Moloka‘i, O‘ahu, French Frigate Shoals
 Conchopus pacificus Masunaga & Saigusa, 2010 – Hawai‘i, O‘ahu, Kaua‘i, Wake
 Conchopus pudicus Takagi, 1965 – Japan
 Conchopus rectus Takagi, 1965 – Japan, China
 Conchopus sikokianus Takagi, 1965 – Japan
 Conchopus taivanensis Takagi, 1967 – Japan, Taiwansinuatus species group:
 Conchopus corvus Takagi, 1965
 Conchopus sinuatus Takagi, 1965sigmiger species group:
 Conchopus saigusai Takagi, 1965
 Conchopus sigmiger Takagi, 1965
 Conchopus uvasima Takagi, 1965convergens species group:
 Conchopus convergens Takagi, 1965
 Conchopus poseidonius Takagi, 1965
 Conchopus signatus Takagi, 1965nodulatus species group:
 Conchopus nodulatus Takagi, 1965
 Conchopus mammuthus Takagi, 1965anomalopus species group:
 Conchopus anomalopus Takagi, 1965abdominalis species group:
 Conchopus abdominalis Takagi, 1965

Other species:
 Conchopus shandongensis'' (Zhu, Yang & Masunaga, 2005)

References

Dolichopodidae genera
Hydrophorinae
Diptera of Asia
Insects of Hawaii
Taxa named by Sadao Takagi